Porter Dallas (1904 – February 1, 1936) was an American Negro league third baseman between 1929 and 1932.

A native of New Orleans, Louisiana, Dallas made his Negro leagues debut in 1929 with the Birmingham Black Barons. He went on to play for the Monroe Monarchs in 1932. Dallas died in New Orleans in 1936 at age 31 or 32.

References

External links
 and Seamheads

1904 births
1936 deaths
Birmingham Black Barons players
Monroe Monarchs players
Baseball third basemen
Baseball players from New Orleans
20th-century African-American sportspeople